The 1904 Republican National Convention was held in the Chicago Coliseum, Chicago, Cook County, Illinois, on June 21 to June 23, 1904.

The popular President Theodore Roosevelt had easily ensured himself of the nomination; a threat had come from the Old Guard favourite Ohio Senator Mark Hanna, the loyal kingmaker in Republican politics, but he died early in 1904, which ended any opposition to Roosevelt within the Republican Party.

There were also very informal talks with future president William Howard Taft about trying for the nomination, but Taft refused these motions as evidenced by a letter to Henry Hoyt, the Solicitor General, in 1903.

Roosevelt was nominated by 994 votes to none, while the only other serious opponent to Roosevelt, Indiana Senator Charles W. Fairbanks, was nominated for vice president by acclaimation.

Platform

The 1904 Republican platform favored the protective tariff, increased foreign trade, the gold standard, expansion of the Merchant Marine and strengthening of the United States Navy; it also praised Roosevelt's foreign and domestic policies.

Vice Presidential candidates
As Theodore Roosevelt had ascended to the presidency following the death of William McKinley on September 14 1901, he served the remainder of McKinley's term without a vice president as the 25th Amendment had not yet been passed. This also left the Convention with the task of choosing a running mate for Roosevelt. 

Entering the convention, Senator Charles Fairbanks of Indiana was considered the likely favorite for the vice presidential nomination, but the Roosevelt administration favored Illinois Representative Robert R. Hitt or Secretary of War William Howard Taft of Ohio; Speaker Joseph Gurney Cannon of Illinois also had support among the delegates, but Cannon had no desire to leave his position in the House. After the administration decided not to launch a fight over the nomination of Fairbanks, he was nominated by acclamation.

Speakers
There were significantly fewer speakers at the 1904 convention than there are at a typical convention today. This is because the convention at the time was much lower in viewership (as there were not the mass media devices of TV or radio at this time only those actually invited saw it). Also, this was before the primary era so the delegates were expected to nominate the candidate at the actual convention as well as more typical tasks such as electing the chairman and handling other business which varies in importance at the Republican Convention today. Nonetheless, there were speeches by the following individuals at the 1904 Republican National Convention:

Tuesday, June 21
Opening prayer by Rev. Timothy Prescott Frost, D. D.
Elihu Root, United States Secretary of War

Wednesday, June 22
Opening prayer by Rev. Thomas E. Cox
Joseph Gurney Cannon, Speaker of the United States House of Representatives and Convention Chairman.

Thursday, June 23
Opening prayer by Rev.  Thaddeus A. Snively.
Frank S. Black, Governor of New York.
Albert J. Beveridge, United States Senator from Indiana.
George A. Knight, Attorney and Businessman
H.S. Edwards, Southern Writer
William O'Connell Bradley, Former Kentucky Governor
Joseph B. Cotton, Former Minnesota State Representative.
Harry Sythe Cummings, First African-American City Councilman from Baltimore, Maryland
Jonathan P. Dolliver, United States Senator from Iowa
Chauncey Depew, United States Senator from New York
Joseph B. Foraker, United States Senator from Ohio and former Governor of Ohio
Samuel W. Pennypacker, Governor of Pennsylvania
Thomas H. Carter, United States Senator from Montana

Roosevelt and his running mate Charles Fairbanks, were unanimously nominated but unlike candidates today they did not give convention speeches instead having individuals give nominating speeches for them. Roosevelt's nomination speech was made by former New York Governor Frank S. Black and it was seconded by Indiana Senator Albert Beveridge. Fairbanks's nomination speech was made by Iowa Senator Jonathan P. Dolliver and seconded by New York Senator Chauncey Depew.

See also
History of the United States Republican Party
List of Republican National Conventions
U.S. presidential nomination convention
1904 United States presidential election
1904 Democratic National Convention

References

Bibliography

 Official Proceedings of the Thirteenth Republican National Convention: Held in the City of Chicago, June 21, 22, 23, 1904

External links
 Republican Party platform of 1904 at The American Presidency Project

1904 United States presidential election
Political conventions in Chicago
Republican National Conventions
1904 in Illinois
1904 conferences
June 1904 events